Gurnee–Sherwood House, also known as the Gurnee–Onderdonck House, is a historic home located at Wesley Hills in Rockland County, New York. It was built about 1795, and is a -story, "L"-shaped, vernacular brick dwelling with stone ends.  It has a recent frame addition.  The original house features a saltbox profile, brick keying, and large stabilizing ashlar sandstone quoins.

It was listed on the National Register of Historic Places in 2011.

References

Houses on the National Register of Historic Places in New York (state)
Houses completed in 1795
Houses in Rockland County, New York
National Register of Historic Places in Rockland County, New York